The 1979 Gabriel 400 was a NASCAR Winston Cup Series race that took place on June 17, 1979, at Michigan International Speedway in Brooklyn, Michigan.

The NASCAR Winston Cup Series races that were being shown at Michigan International Speedway between the late-1970s and the late-1980s were exceptionally good by modern standards.

Background
Opened in 1968, the track's turns are banked at eighteen degrees, while the 3,600-foot-long front stretch, the location of the finish line, is banked at twelve degrees. The back stretch, has a five degree banking and is 2,242 feet long.

Race report
Two hundred laps were done on a paved oval track spanning . The total time of the race was two hours, fifty-six minutes, and forty-four seconds. There were six cautions for thirty-three laps with the race finishing under caution.

Sixty-two thousand fans managed to see Buddy Baker defeat Donnie Allison under caution. The race was also Bill Seifert's final start in addition to being Bill Elliott's 33rd start in the NASCAR Cup Series; Elliott would lead the first lap of his NASCAR Cup Series career during this event. Other famous drivers like Darrell Waltrip (who retained the championship points lead after this race but lost it at the 1979 running of the Los Angeles Times 500 by 11 points), Richard Childress (now the owner of Richard Childress Racing), Benny Parsons, and Terry Labonte have participated in this race.

This was Marty Robbins' last race in his signature #42. He would switch to using a variety of different numbers from here on out, normally the #6. He changed numbers to free up the #42 for young Kyle Petty to use it, reviving his family's use of the digit his grandfather Lee Petty had made so famous.

Engine problems took out Bill Seifert on lap 32 in addition to Marty Robbins on lap 64 and Bill Green on lap 76. Problems with the vehicle's shocks eliminated Tommy Gale from the race on lap 84. Lap 97 would be very unkind to Paul Fess and Benny Parsons; whose vehicles would suffer from faulty engines. Joe Millikan would notice that his vehicle's engine stopped working on lap 103 while Roger Hamby would inflict terminal vehicle damage on lap 122. Further engine problems knocked David Sosebee out of the race on lap 135 and Ronnie Thomas on lap 150. Dave Marcis would inflict terminal vehicle damage on lap 173. Bob Burcham noticed that his vehicle's engine stopped working on lap 184. Frank Warren inflicted terminal vehicle damage on lap 186 while Darrell Waltrip had to leave the race due to a faulty engine on lap 197.

While substituting for Roger Hamby during the middle of this racing event, Steve Pfieffer lost control of his car during a caution period and injured a couple of spectators on the pit wall while attempting to stop his vehicle for maintenance. He would be later sent to Foote West Hospital in nearby Jackson; where the doctors gave him a good prognosis and eventually released him with cuts on his right knee and chest.

The lead changed 47 times among 11 drivers. Dale Earnhardt was criticized by Darrell Waltrip and Richard Petty when he nearly spun out trying to pass Neil Bonnett late in the race in front of both ("He nearly took us all out in the third turn," Waltrip said after the race).

Notable crew chiefs to actively participate in the race were Buddy Parrott, Tex Powell, Joey Arrington, Kirk Shelmerdine, Darrell Bryant, Dale Innman, Harry Hyde, Bud Moore, Tim Brewer, and Jake Elder. The total winnings of this race were $148,505 ($ when adjusted for inflation). Buddy Baker earned $16,780 in cash prizes for his win ($ when adjusted for inflation) while Bill Seifert walked away only $960 wealthier ($ when adjusted for inflation).

Qualifying

Finishing order
Section reference:

† signifies that the driver is known to be deceased 
* Driver failed to finish race

Standings after the race

References

Gabriel 400
Gabriel 400
NASCAR races at Michigan International Speedway